Caputmunda is a genus of wood midges in the family Cecidomyiidae. The one described species - Caputmunda yantardakhica - is only known from Taymyr amber from the Late Cretaceous. It differs from other genera in its tribe due to wing venation and a short first tarsomere.

References

Cecidomyiidae genera

Insects described in 2016
Taxa named by Zoya A. Fedotova
Taxa named by Evgeny Perkovsky
Fossil taxa described in 2016
Monotypic Diptera genera